Business process automation (BPA), also known as business automation or digital transformation, is the technology-enabled automation of complex business processes. It can streamline a business for simplicity, achieve digital transformation, increase service quality, improve service delivery or contain costs. It consists of integrating applications, restructuring labor resources and using software applications throughout the organization. Robotic process automation is an emerging field within BPA.

Deployment
Toolsets vary in sophistication, but there is an increasing trend towards the use of artificial intelligence technologies that can understand natural language and unstructured data sets, interact with human beings, and adapt to new types of problems without human-guided training.

In order to automate the processes, connectors are needed to fit these systems/solutions together with a data exchange layer to transfer the information. A process driven messaging service is an option for optimizing data exchange layer. By mapping the end-to-end process workflow, an integration between individual platforms using a process driven messaging platform can be built.

A business process management implementation
A business process management system is different from BPA. However, it is possible to build automation on the back of a BPM implementation. The actual tools to achieve this vary, from writing custom application code to using specialist BPA tools. The advantages and disadvantages of this approach are inextricably linked – the BPM implementation provides an architecture for all processes in the business to be mapped, but this in itself delays the automation of individual processes and so benefits may be lost in the meantime.

Robotic process automation

The practice of performing robotic process automation (RPA) results in the deployment of attended or unattended software agents to an organization's environment. These software agents, or robots, are deployed to perform pre-defined structured and repetitive sets of business tasks or processes: The goal is for humans to focus on more productive tasks, while the software agents handle the repetitive ones.

BPA providers tend to focus on different industry sectors but the underlying approach tends to be similar in that BPA providers will attempt to provide the shortest route to automation by interacting with the user interface rather than going into the application code or database behind it. BPA providers also simplify their own interface to the extent that these tools can be used directly by non-technically qualified staff. The main advantage of these toolsets is therefore their speed of deployment.

Use of artificial intelligence
Artificial intelligence software robots are deployed to handle unstructured data sets (like images, texts, audios) and are deployed after performing and deploying robotic process automation: They can, for instance, populate an automatic transcript from a video. The combination of automation and artificial intelligence (AI) brings autonomy for the robots, along with the capability in mastering cognitive tasks: At this stage, the robot is able to learn and improve the processes by analyzing and adapting them.

See also 
 Business-driven development
 Business Process Model and Notation
 Business process reengineering
 Business Process Execution Language (BPEL)
 Business rules engine
 Comparison of business integration software
 Job scheduler
 Real-time enterprise
 Runbook
 Synthetic intelligence
 Weak AI

References 

Business terms
Business process management
Automation
Artificial intelligence